The  Buseck Center for Meteorite Studies was founded in 1960, on the Tempe Campus of Arizona State University, and houses the world's largest university-based meteorite collection.  The collection contains specimens from over 1,600 separate meteorite falls and finds, and is actively used internationally for planetary, geological and space science research.  The Center also operates a meteorite museum which is open to the public.

In 2021, the Center for Meteorite Studies was named in honor of Professor Peter R. Buseck.

See also
 Nininger Meteorite Award
 Harvey H. Nininger
 Carleton B. Moore

References

Sources and external links
 Center for Meteorite Studies official website
 ASU Museums: Center for Meteorite Studies
 Map: 

University museums in Arizona
Arizona State University
Geology museums in Arizona
Natural history museums in Arizona
Museums in Tempe, Arizona
Museums established in 1960